Wade Bosarge (born September 14, 1955) is a former American football defensive back. He played for the Miami Dolphins and New Orleans Saints in 1977.

References

1955 births
Living people
American football defensive backs
Tulsa Golden Hurricane football players
Miami Dolphins players
New Orleans Saints players